Edward Serlin House was completed in 1949, and is the second of three designs by Frank Lloyd Wright for Usonia, planned as a cooperative community starting in the late 1940s. This is now known as the Usonia Historic District and is located in Pleasantville, New York. The community was listed on the National Register of Historic Places in 2012. 

The home has three bedrooms, two bathrooms, and is on a five-foot square module, with a shed roof over the living room. Construction was supervised by former Wright apprentice, David Henken, with additions to the design made by Aaron L. Resnick.

References
 Storrer, William Allin. The Frank Lloyd Wright Companion. University Of Chicago Press, 2006,  (S.317)

External links
 Photos on Arcaid

Frank Lloyd Wright buildings
Houses in Westchester County, New York